The Greek Catholic diocese of Oradea Mare is the Eparchy of the Romanian Greek Catholic Church for the area of Oradea.

It was founded in 1777, followers of the Greek Rite having been up to that time under the jurisdiction of the Latin bishop. Originally the see was a suffragan of Esztergom (Gran); when, however, in 1853 the Greek Catholic Diocese of Făgăraș and Alba Iulia became the Archdiocese of Făgăraș and Alba Iulia, the diocese of Oradea Mare was transferred to its jurisdiction. The see is divided into six archidiaconates and 19 vice-archidiaconates.

Bishops
The list of the eparch (bishops) of the Greek Catholic Diocese of Oradea Mare is:
 Meletie Covaci (born 1707, converted to the Greek Catholic Church in 1736, reigned 1748–1775 as auxiliary bishop of the Latin bishop of Oradea)
 Moise Dragoș (born 1725, reigned 1775–1787, under his reign in 1777 the diocese became independent from the Latin bishop]
 Ignațiu Darabant (born 1730, reigned 1788–1805)
 Samuil Vulcan (born 1758, reigned 1806–1839)
 Vasile Erdeli (born 1794, reigned 1842–1862)
 Iosif Papp-Szilágyi (Sălăjeanul) (born 1813, reigned 1863–1873)
 Ioan Olteanu (born 1839, reigned 1873–1877)
 Mihail Pavel (born 1827, reigned 1879–1902)
 Demetriu Radu (born 1861, reigned 1903–1920)
 Valeriu Traian Frențiu (born 1875, reign started in 1922. In 1948 the Communist Romania abolished the Greek Catholic Church. Frențiu was persecuted and died in prison in 1952)
 Iuliu Hirțea (born 1914, he was the clandestine bishop of Oradea from 1952. He spent many years in prison. Died in 1978)
 1978–1990 vacant due to the persecution under the Communist Regime, until the Romanian Revolution of 1989
 Vasile Hossu (born 1919, reigned 1990–1997)
 Virgil Bercea (born 1957, reigned 1997–incumbent)

Notable priests  
Alexander Ratiu

References

External links
  Official site
 catholic-hierarchy.org

Oradea
Oradea
Romanian Greek Catholic Church dioceses
Religious organizations established in 1777
Dioceses established in the 18th century